Abraão Lincoln Martins, or simply Lincoln (born 14 June 1983), is a Brazilian striker who currently plays for Brasiliense.

Club statistics

References

External links

1983 births
Living people
Brazilian footballers
Brazilian expatriate footballers
Expatriate footballers in Bolivia
Expatriate footballers in Japan
Avispa Fukuoka players
Shonan Bellmare players
Thespakusatsu Gunma players
Oriente Petrolero players
Paulista Futebol Clube players
Brasiliense Futebol Clube players
J2 League players
Association football forwards